The 2015 Russian Artistic Gymnastics Championships were held in Penza, Russia from March 5–8 for senior and April 1–4 for junior.

Medal winners

Results

Senior Team Final

Senior All-Around 
Senior Team members Aliya Mustafina , Anastasia Grishina and  Anna Rodionova didn't attend.
Senior Reserve members Daria Mikhailova didn't attend.

Senior Vault

Senior Uneven Bars

Senior Balance Beam

Senior Floor Exercise

Junior Team Final

Junior All-Around (MS)

Junior All-Around (CMS)

European Championships selections 
The team to the 2015 European Artistic Gymnastics Championships was announced on 10 March 2015.

References

External links
  Official site

2015 in gymnastics
Artistic Gymnastics Championships
Russian Artistic Gymnastics Championships
March 2015 sports events in Russia
April 2015 sports events in Russia